The Italy women's national under-23 volleyball team represents Italy in international women's volleyball competitions and friendly matches under age 23 and it is ruled by the Italian Volleyball Federation That is an affiliate of International Volleyball Federation FIVB and also a part of European Volleyball Confederation CEV.

Results

FIVB U23 World Championship
 Champions   Runners up   Third place   Fourth place

Team

Current squad

The following is the Italian roster in the 2015 FIVB Volleyball Women's U23 World Championship.

Head Coach: Luca Cristofani

References

External links
  Official website 

National women's under-23 volleyball teams
Volleyball
Volleyball in Italy
Women's volleyball in Italy